Tasha Alexander (born Anastasia Gutting on December 1, 1969) is an American author who writes New York Times bestselling historical mystery fiction.

Biography 
Alexander was born and raised in South Bend, Indiana to Anastasia (Friel) and Gary Gutting, University of Notre Dame philosophy professors.

In 2002, while living in New Haven, Connecticut, she started work on her first novel, after being inspired by a passage in Dorothy L. Sayers's Gaudy Night. Carolyn Marino at William Morrow acquired the book, And Only to Deceive, which was published in 2005 as the first installment of the Lady Emily series. Following a move to Franklin, Tennessee, where Alexander wrote her second novel in a local Starbucks, she eventually relocated to Chicago, where she married British novelist Andrew Grant (brother of bestselling author Lee Child) in 2010.

In 2007, according to Library Journal, Minotaur Books "lured her away" from William Morrow. She is now edited by Charles Spicer and is the imprint's top writer of historical mysteries. Alexander's work has been translated into more than a dozen languages and has been nominated for the Bruce Alexander Award and the RT Reviewers Choice Award. She has a reputation for being extremely careful about accuracy in her novels and is meticulous about research.

The Lady Emily series 
The Lady Emily series, set in a time between the 1890s and 1900s and spanning across cities throughout Europe, follow the adventures of Lady Emily and her husband Colin Hargreaves.

Novels and short stories

Non-Lady Emily short story works 
(Short stories appearing in anthology collections)
 "Preparations" – Kwik Krimes (2013; anthology edited by Otto Penzler) 
 "Before a Bohemian Scandal" – Echoes of Sherlock Holmes (2016; anthology edited by Laurie R. King and Leslie S. Klinger) 
 "[self-titled essay]" – Private Investigations (2020; anthology edited by Victoria Zackheim)

Miscellaneous works 
 Elizabeth: The Golden Age, novelization, (2007);  based on motion picture screenplay written by William Nicholson and Michael Hirst; published to coincide with release of 2007 film Elizabeth: The Golden Age, starring Cate Blanchett and Clive Owen.

References

External links 
 

Living people
1969 births
American women novelists
American women short story writers
American short story writers
Writers from South Bend, Indiana
Women mystery writers
Novelists from Indiana
21st-century American women